Mental Health Research Institute may refer to:

 Mental Research Institute, in Palo Alto
 Mental Health Research Institute (Melbourne)
 Mental Health Research Institute (Michigan)